Rupali may refer to:

 Rupali Bank, a commercial bank in Bangladesh
 Rupali Akhter, Bangladeshi Kabaddi player
 Rupali Bhosale, Indian television actress
 Rupali Ganguly (born 1977), Indian actress
 Rupali Krishnarao, Indian actress
 Rupali Repale (born 1982), Indian swimmer and triathlete

See also